Anabasis aphylla is a species of flowering plant in the family Amaranthaceae, native to the region surrounding the Caspian Sea, Central Asia, and Xinjiang and western Gansu provinces of China. A many-branched shrub usually found growing in alluvial fans and dune swales, it is sometimes planted to catch blowing soil and stabilize sand dunes. The alkaloid anabasine was named for this toxic species, from which it was first isolated by Orechoff and Menschikoff in the year 1931. Anabasine was widely used as an insecticide in the former Soviet Union until 1970.

References

Amaranthaceae
Flora of South European Russia
Flora of the Caucasus
Flora of Iran
Flora of Central Asia
Flora of Xinjiang
Flora of Gansu
Plants described in 1753
Taxa named by Carl Linnaeus